Second-seeded Alice Marble defeated Nancye Wynne 6–0, 6–3 in the final to win the women's singles tennis title at the 1938 U.S. National Championships.

Seeds
The tournament used two lists of eight players for seeding the women's singles event; one for U.S. players and one for foreign players. Alice Marble is the champion; others show in brackets the round in which they were eliminated.

  Helen Jacobs (third round)
  Alice Marble (champion)
  Dorothy Bundy (semifinals)
  Sarah Fabyan (semifinals)
  Gracyn Wheeler (third round)
  Barbara Winslow (third round)
  Helen Pedersen (third round)
  Dorothy Workman (third round)

  Jadwiga Jędrzejowska (quarterfinals)
  Simonne Mathieu (quarterfinals)
  Kay Stammers (quarterfinals)
  Nancye Wynne (finalist)
  Thelma Coyne (third round)
  Margot Lumb (quarterfinals)
  Nell Hopman (third round)
  Dorothy Stevenson (third round)

Draw

Final eight

References

1938
1938 in women's tennis
1938 in American women's sports
Women's Singles